Tikmeh Dash may refer to several places in Iran:
 Tikmeh Dash, Bostanabad, East Azerbaijan Province
 Tikmeh Dash, Hashtrud, East Azerbaijan Province
 Tikmeh Dash, Zanjan
 Tikmeh Dash District, in East Azerbaijan Province

See also
 Tekmeh Dash (disambiguation)